Trond Helleland (born 10 July 1962 in Kvam, Hordaland) is a Norwegian politician representing the Conservative Party. He is currently a representative of Buskerud in the Storting and was first elected in 1997.

Storting committees

2005–2009 - member of the Transportation and Communication committee.

2005–2009 - reserve member of the Electoral committee.

2001–2005 - leader of the Law committee.

2001–2005 - member of the Electoral committee.

2001–2005 - reserve member of the Extended Foreign Affairs committee.

1997–2001 - member of the Family, Culture and Administration committee.

External links

1962 births
Living people
Conservative Party (Norway) politicians
Members of the Storting
21st-century Norwegian politicians
20th-century Norwegian politicians
People from Kvam